The following lists events that happened during 1972 in Rhodesia.

Incumbents
 President: Clifford Dupont 
 Prime Minister: Ian Smith

January
11 January-11 March - The Pearce Commission arrives in Rhodesia to conduct tests of acceptability of settlement proposals which was agreed on in 1971

March
10 March - The African National Council is transformed into a political organisation and calls for a constitutional conference

May
31 May - The United States Senate votes against re-imposition of embargo on Rhodesian chromite.

August
22 August - International Olympic Committee asks Rhodesia to withdraw from the 20th Olympic Summer Games held in Munich, Germany

December
21 December - Guerrillas of the Zimbabwe African National Liberation Army (ZANLA) attack Altena farm in Centenary area, marking an unprecedented escalation of the Rhodesian Bush War.

Births
September 29 — Abel Chimukoko, long-distance runner

 
Years of the 20th century in Zimbabwe
Zimbabwe